Philip Sargant Florence (25 June 1890 – 29 January 1982) was an American economist who spent most of his life in the United Kingdom.

Life

Born in Nutley, New Jersey in the United States, he was the son of Henry Smyth Florence, an American musician, and Mary Sargant Florence, a British painter. His sister was Alix Strachey. He was educated at Windlesham House School, Rugby School and Gonville and Caius College, Cambridge, before studying for his PhD at Columbia University in New York City. In 1917 he married the writer and birth control advocate Lella Faye Secor.

In 1921 he was appointed as a lecturer in economics at the University of Cambridge, and in 1929 he was made Professor of Commerce at the University of Birmingham, where he remained until his retirement in 1955. He was a friend of Robert Dudley Best, and a mentor of Hilde Behrend.

References

20th-century American economists
People educated at Rugby School
Alumni of Gonville and Caius College, Cambridge
Columbia University alumni
Academics of the University of Birmingham
1982 deaths
1890 births
Economists from New Jersey
People from Nutley, New Jersey
People educated at Windlesham House School